Li Rui (April 13, 1917 – February 16, 2019) was a Chinese politician, historian and dissident Chinese Communist Party (CCP) member. 

As a young student activist, Li joined the communists in 1937 during the Chinese Civil War. By 1958, he had become the vice-minister of the Ministry of Water Resources. His vocal opposition to the Three Gorges Dam brought him to the attention of the Chairman of the CCP, Mao Zedong. Mao, impressed by Li, made Li his personal secretary for industrial affairs. However, Li was known for his independence of thought, and defied Mao at the 1959 Lushan Conference. Li was expelled from the party and sent to a prison camp, beginning nearly twenty years of political exile. Denounced by his family for anti-Mao activities during the Great Leap Forward and Cultural Revolution, he spent eight years in solitary confinement at the Qincheng Prison.

After Mao's death, Li's party membership was restored and he regained an influential position in the CCP. However, after only a few years, he was forced to resign due to his unwillingness to give preference to the children of influential party members. From the mid-1980s, shut out of formal power, Li wrote and commentated extensively, calling for freedom of speech, freedom of the press, and democracy within a socialist framework. He also wrote five books on Mao and early Communist Party history. Li remained a party member until his death, respected but isolated; his views were formally denounced and he was censored in the Chinese press. Li died in 2019, aged 101. He was described by The Guardian in 2005 as living a life "filled with rebellions, often at great personal cost, against those who abused their power."

Early life 
Li Rui was born Li Housheng in Pingjiang County, Hunan Province, in April 1917, to a wealthy family. His father had been a member of the Tongmenghui, an anti-imperial revolutionary party, but died in 1922, when Li was only five. While a high schooler, living in Hubei, Li protested against warlordism. In 1934, he enrolled in Wuhan University, studying mechanical engineering. As a student, he participated in the movement against Japan, then occupying China during the Second Sino-Japanese War.

Political career

Young Communist activist 
Li secretly joined the Chinese Communist Party in February 1937. A dedicated activist, he was briefly jailed by the Republic of China's Kuomintang government for communist activities. Li trekked on foot to the Communist base in Yan'an in the late 1930s—upon his departure, his mother had said to him: "The Communists are good, but you might get killed." Serving as a writer for the Communist newsletter Liberation, he criticized fellow communists so frequently that he was temporarily imprisoned as a suspected spy; Li was later described as "blunt, brash, and quick-witted" by the New York Times.

From December 1939, he led the propaganda branch of the party's Central Youth Working Committee. He became the editor of domestic commentary for the Jiefang Daily in September 1941 and later the newspaper's head of the editorial bureau for areas under Communist control. He also served as a secretary to Chen Yun, who would later be an architect of China's economic reform under Deng Xiaoping.

In 1945, Li was made the secretary to Gao Gang, a post which he held until 1947. In October 1952, after the Communist victory in the Chinese civil war, Li became a part of the Ministry of Water Resources. By 1958, he had risen to become its deputy head, the youngest vice-minister in China. He attracted the attention of China's leader, Mao Zedong, through his passionate opposition to the building of the Three Gorges Dam—Mao invited him to Beijing to argue on the issue, and was impressed by Li's zeal and intelligence.

Secretary for Mao, labor camp, and exile 
Mao hired Li as his personal secretary for industrial affairs, but his criticisms of the Great Leap Forward and support for Peng Dehuai soon became an issue. At a 1959 meeting in Lushan, Li insisted on opposing Mao's views, and was branded an anti-Maoist conspirator. Li later declared that Mao was dismissive of the suffering caused by his policies: "Mao's way of thinking and governing was terrifying. He put no value on human life. The deaths of others meant nothing to him".

Li was denounced as an anti-Mao conspirator and sent to a penal camp near the border with the Soviet Union. He came close to starving, but was saved by a transfer to a more survivable camp arranged by outside friends. Stripped of his Communist Party membership, Li was offered early release if he was willing to renounce his criticisms of Mao, but declined to do so. Released in 1961, Li returned to Beijing, where his wife divorced and denounced him. One of his daughters, Li Nanyang, became estranged from him after reporting anti-Mao remarks he had made in private. He was sent to teach at a small school in the mountains, exiling him from political processes.

In 1966, Mao's Cultural Revolution began, and Li was asked to denounce his old colleagues among Mao's private secretaries. Refusing to do so, he was imprisoned in solitary confinement at the Qincheng Prison. Li maintained his grip on sanity by writing poetry in the margins of Communist books using iodine pilfered from the prison's medical facilities. Li was released in 1975 and sent back to his internal exile, returning to teaching at the same school in the mountains.

Return to prominence 
However, after Mao's death in 1976 and the emergence of Deng Xiaoping, Li regained his party membership. In 1982, he was elected to the Central Committee of the Party for a five-year term, and in April of the same year he became vice director of the Organization Department of the Communist Party, an influential role focused on the promotion, demotion, and recruitment of senior officials within the party. However, in 1984 he was forced to resign from this role after being unwilling to "give special preference to the offspring of senior officials," according to the New York Times.

Li, whose opposition to the Three Gorges Dam had first brought him to prominence, continued to fight against construction of the dam throughout the 1980s, working with environmentalist Dai Qing. In 1989, Li personally witnessed the violent crackdown in the Muxidi neighborhood of Beijing during the Tiananmen Square protests, strengthening his opposition to the party's authoritarian wing. He was an ally of prominent reformists such as Zhao Ziyang and Hu Yaobang.

Party elder, historian, and dissident 
After officially retiring in June 1995 at age 78, Li became known as a party elder and historian of Mao, writing five works on Mao's life and history in the party. His works did not hesitate to criticize Mao or contemporary party leaders. Considered the "veteran liberal member" of the CCP, according to The Economist, Li argued for free speech, freedom of the press, and democracy within a socialist framework. In November 2004, the party's Propaganda Department banned Li from being published in the media. His books on Mao were censored and banned in Mainland China. Described as a thorn in the side of the Communist Party's autocratic leaders (his personal name, Rui 锐, means sharp in Chinese), his views were secretly but officially denounced as subversive in 2013.

Before every quinquennial Communist Party congress, Li wrote to fellow senior party members, advocating political reform. At the 16th Party Congress in 2002, Li wrote an open letter to new elected Party general secretary Hu Jintao on political reform of the Communist Party. In the letter, Li argued that constitutionalism would lead the Communist Party away from political mishaps such as the Anti-Rightist Movement, the Great Leap Forward and the Cultural Revolution. In 2006, he was a lead signatory to an open letter condemning the state's closure of the investigative newspaper Freezing Point. Ahead of the 17th Communist Party Congress in 2007, Li and retired academic Xie Tao published articles calling for the Communist Party to become a European-style socialist party, remarks that were condemned by the party propaganda apparatus. In October 2010, Li was the lead signatory to an open letter to the Standing Committee of the National People's Congress, calling for greater press freedom. In 2017, Li failed to attend the 19th Party Congress, which was seen as an act of defiance against General Secretary Xi Jinping's elevation above collective leadership. Having devoted his life to the Communist Party, Li never considered leaving it, but wrote in a poem of its modern "arrogance, ignorance, shamelessness, lawlessness."

Personal life
Li was married to his first wife, Fan Yuanzhen, for twenty-two years, from 1940 to 1962; they had two daughters (including Li Nanyang) and a son. Fan died in 2008. His second wife (and later widow) was Zhang Yuzhen; they were married in 1979.

As he aged, Li retained his mental sharpness. In spite of his political views, he was allowed to keep his privileges as a senior CCP member, such as better medical treatment and his apartment in "Minister's House", a building reserved for venerated party retirees. Li kept a diary continuously from 1935 until 2018, which is now held by the Hoover Institution in California. The diary, along with Li's other papers, was the subject of a lawsuit in 2019.

Death and funeral 
Li died of organ failure in Beijing on February 16, 2019, aged 101.  As an early and senior member of the Communist Party, Li was given a state funeral and buried at the Babaoshan Revolutionary Cemetery, despite his wish to have been interred with his parents in Hunan, his home province. News of his death was limited by official censorship, and his funeral was "conducted with secrecy and security". Despite the restrictions, the funeral attracted hundreds of mourners, ranging from ordinary Chinese citizens to those few still living among his old colleagues and fellow revolutionaries. Notwithstanding his fervent opposition to their policies, both of China's leaders, General Secretary Xi Jinping and Premier Li Keqiang, sent wreaths.

Publications 

 (1989) , English translation: Records of the Lushan Conference, ISBN 7506901994
 (1998),  English translation: The Diary of Li Rui, Visiting Papers, ISBN 7506314975
(1998), English translation: To Put It Bluntly: Li Rui's Sixty Years of Worries and Thoughts, ISBN 9787507209440
(1998), English translation: Collection of Poems, ISBN 7505931369
 (1999) , English translation: The Collected Works of Li Rui, Volume One: The True Faces of the Lushan Conference, ISBN 7806096736
 (1999) , English translation: The Collected Works of Li Rui, Volume Two: The Tragedy of Mao Zedong's Later Years, ISBN 7806096736
 (1999) , English translation: The Collected Works of Li Rui, Volume Three: My Experience of "The Great Leap Forward", ISBN 7806096736
 (2005) , English translation: Li Rui on Mao Zedong, ISBN 988-98282-2-7
 (2009) , English translation: Mao Zedong Before The Age of Thirty, ISBN 9787218015767
(2014) , English translation: Mao Zedong: Prosperous Years (1893–1923), ISBN 7550220581
 (2015) , English translation: Mao Zedong's Early Reading Life, ISBN 7547033822

References

External links 
Li Rui Papers (Collection) at the Hoover Institution
Panel discussion of Li Rui at Stanford University (Stanford Daily)

1917 births
2019 deaths
Chinese centenarians
Men centenarians
Chinese Communist Party politicians from Beijing
People's Republic of China politicians from Beijing
Victims of the Cultural Revolution
Members of the 12th Central Committee of the Chinese Communist Party
National Wuhan University alumni
Burials at Babaoshan Revolutionary Cemetery
Secretaries to Mao Zedong